WCMP-FM (100.9 FM, "Cool Country 100.9 FM") is a radio station licensed to serve Pine City, Minnesota. It airs a country music format.

It is owned by Alan R. Quarnstrom, through licensee Q Media Properties, and has studios at 15429 Pokegama Lake Rd. This facility is shared with sister station WCMP.

The station was assigned the WCMP-FM call letters by the Federal Communications Commission on August 9, 1979, originally at 92.1 FM.

Ownership
In July 2001, Quarnstrom Media Group LLC (Alan R. Quarnstrom, president) agreed to purchase WCMP and WCMP-FM from Pine City Broadcasting Co. Inc., for a reported sale price of $1.25 million. The deal was approved by the FCC on August 23, 2001, and the deal was consummated on September 4, 2001.

In June 2007, Red Rock Radio Corp. (Romeo "Ro" Grignon, president) reached an agreement to purchase WCMP and WCMP-FM from Alan Quarnstrom for a reported sale price of $1.6 million. The deal was approved by the FCC on July 20, 2007, and the deal was consummated on August 1, 2007.

On September 16, 2016, Red Rock Radio announced that it would sell WCMP and WCMP-FM to Q Media Properties, putting the stations back under the control of Alan Quarnstrom; the sale was completed on November 30, 2016 at a purchase price of $300,000.

References

External links

Radio stations in Minnesota
Country radio stations in the United States
Pine County, Minnesota
Radio stations established in 1977
1977 establishments in Minnesota